Boni Boyer (July 28, 1958 – December 4, 1996) was an American vocalist, multi-instrumentalist and composer. She was best known for her work with Prince in the late 1980s.

Biography
Boyer was playing keyboards and singing backing vocals with Sheila E.’s group when Prince was forming a new touring band after the break-up of The Revolution, in 1986. When Sheila E. became the drummer in the new band, she also brought Boyer and her bassist Levi Seacer, Jr. with her. Boyer performed as keyboardist and vocalist on the concert tours for Sign o' the Times and on the albums and concert tours for Lovesexy and Graffiti Bridge.

Technically Boni Boyer left Prince's band for Australia after the Lovesexy tour was over. The same goes for Cat, but Sheila E who protested the changing of the band, suffered back issues/collapsed lung after she parted ways with Prince when she did not agree with the direction of Prince's 4th album for her.
When Prince formed The New Power Generation in 1990, Boyer left the band along with Sheila E. and Cat Glover. She performed and recorded with many artists, including Tony! Toni! Toné!, Con Funk Shun, Digital Underground, Lionel Richie and Al Jarreau.  
  
Boyer died from a brain aneurysm in San Pablo, California, Contra Costa County, California, U.S..

Discography
With Prince
 Lovesexy (1988)
 Graffiti Bridge (1990)

With Sheila E.
 Sheila E. (1987)

With Al Jarreau
 Heaven and Earth (1992)

Filmography
 Sign o' the Times (1987)
 The Adventures of Ford Fairlane (1990)

References

External links

1958 births
1996 deaths
American soul keyboardists
American rhythm and blues keyboardists
American soul singers
American funk keyboardists
American pop keyboardists
American rhythm and blues singers
American funk singers
American women pop singers
American jazz keyboardists
Deaths from intracranial aneurysm
20th-century American women singers
20th-century American singers